The Elassona Mosque or Muharrem Pasha Mosque, is an Ottoman mosque at Elassona, Thessaly, Greece, dating to the 17th/18th century.

A simple and austere structure, the mosque comprises a single, square prayer hall. It is covered by a dome resting on an octagonal dome supported by pendentives. The walls are of rough masonry with irregular brick bands. The prayer hall is illuminated by 16 windows, arranged in two rows. The windows are framed by plaster frames on the interior. The mihrab is decorated with plain muqarnas. A wooden gallery once existed above the entrance, and a wooden porch stood before the gateway. The founder's inscription above the entrance has been erased. A minaret stood on the northwestern corner, but collapsed in 1961.

Work has been carried out to improve structural stability, but the building is not open to the public. For some time, the building was used to store parts of the Elassona archaeological collection.

References

Former mosques in Greece
Buildings and structures in Larissa (regional unit)
Ottoman mosques in Greece
Ottoman architecture in Thessaly
Mosque buildings with domes